Howard Charles Lincoln (born February 14, 1940) is an American lawyer and businessman, known primarily for being the former Chairman of Nintendo of America and the former Chairman and Chief Executive Officer of the Seattle Mariners baseball team, representing absentee majority owner Hiroshi Yamauchi until Yamauchi died on September 19, 2013.

Early life
Born in Oakland, California, Lincoln was an active Boy Scout. As a thirteen-year-old boy, he posed for the famous Norman Rockwell painting The Scoutmaster, which was published in a calendar in 1956.  In the painting, young Lincoln is on the immediate right of the campfire. Lincoln eventually attained the rank of Eagle Scout and received a Distinguished Eagle Scout Award.

Lincoln matriculated in 1957 at the University of California, Berkeley, where he earned his BA in political science in 1962 and his law degree from Berkeley Law in 1965.  From 1966 to 1970, he served as a Naval lieutenant within the Judge Advocate General's Corps.  He then worked in private practice as an attorney in Seattle, Washington.

Nintendo 
Lincoln did legal work in 1981 for Nintendo, culminating in the legal case  Universal City Studios, Inc. v. Nintendo Co., Ltd., in which Universal City Studios had sued Nintendo claiming that the video game Donkey Kong infringed upon Universal City Studio's rights to King Kong. Lincoln hired John Kirby to represent Nintendo in the courtroom.  Nintendo won the case, as well as successive court appeals.

Lincoln met Yamauchi in 1982 and joined Nintendo in 1983, as its Senior Vice President and General Counsel. He and Minoru Arakawa were instrumental in rebuilding the North American video game industry (after the crash of 1983) with their highly successful marketing of the Nintendo Entertainment System. In 1994, he was appointed its chairman.

As chairman of Nintendo, Lincoln was involved in litigation with Tengen, a subsidiary of Atari Games, about the rights to Tetris, and defended Nintendo's use of the 10NES lock-out chip. He represented the company in the 1993 United States Senate hearings on video games, during which he promised Joe Lieberman and Herb Kohl he would not  release Night Trap on a Nintendo console because it was considered inappropriate for children.

Lincoln announced his retirement from Nintendo in 1999 and departed the company in 2000

Seattle Mariners 
Lincoln's tenure as CEO of the Seattle Mariners has seen both success and controversy. Lincoln was considered instrumental, along with former Senator Slade Gorton, in preserving the team's location in Seattle and negotiating with the city for a new stadium, Safeco Field. His stewardship has seen the team's first post-season appearances, in 1995, 1997, 2000, and 2001, as well as the aggressive expansion of the Mariners into the Japanese market, most noticeably through the acquisition of Japanese superstar Ichiro Suzuki.

He did not retain field managers and general managers like Lou Piniella and Pat Gillick

He retired in 2016, concurrent with Nintendo selling its stake in the team.

Philanthropy 
In addition to Lincoln's business achievements, he is an active philanthropist. He has served as campaign chair for United Way of King County and the Chief Seattle Council of the Boy Scouts of America. He is also a trustee of Western Washington University.

References

External links

N-Sider profile
Western Washington University profile
Lincoln's posing for Norman Rockwell

1940 births
Nintendo people
Living people
United States Navy officers
Seattle Mariners executives
Businesspeople from Oakland, California
University of California, Berkeley alumni
UC Berkeley School of Law alumni
Lawyers from Oakland, California
American chairpersons of corporations
American chief executives of professional sports organizations
Academy of Interactive Arts & Sciences Lifetime Achievement Award recipients
Military personnel from California